Arnot may refer to:

Arnot (surname)
Arnót, a Hungarian village
Arnot Mall, a shopping mall in New York
Arnot Hill Park, a park in Arnold, Nottinghamshire
The Arnot baronets
Arnot Tower, a castle in Perth and Kinross

See also
Arnott (disambiguation)